Microdochium dimerum is a species of fungus that shows promise as a biocontrol agent.

This fungus has potential to protect tomato plants against Botrytis cinerea (gray mold) infections. This fungus has the additional binomial Fusarium dimerum. It has also been found in human eye infections and has been found to be an inhibitory agent for nematodes.

References  

Fungal pest control agents
Tomatoes
Xylariales